Mocz (alt. Mócz, Móc) is a surname originating from Hungary

References

Surnames of Hungarian origin